Li Rubai (李如柏) (1553–1619) was a general of the Ming dynasty. He was the younger brother of Li Rusong the son of Li Chengliang. He participated in the Imjin War and the campaign against the Later Jin Khan Nurhaci. Li Rubai committed suicide after the Later Jin defeated the Ming dynasty at the Battle of Sarhū.

References 

Ming dynasty generals
1553 births
1619 deaths
Chinese people of Korean descent
People of the Japanese invasions of Korea (1592–1598)